Lawrence H. Levy is an American writer and producer on Savannah, Fantasy Island, Family Ties, Trapper John, M.D., Saved by the Bell, Who's the Boss?, 7th Heaven, Roseanne, Seinfeld.

Awards and nominations
Nominated for a 1995 Writers Guild of America Award.
Won 1994 Writers Guild Award for "The Mango" episode of SEINFELD
Nominated for a 1993-4 Emmy Award for "outstanding Writing In A Comedy Series" for SEINFELD
Nominated for a 1994-5 Daytime Emmy Award for "Outstanding Achievement In Animation" for AHH, REAL MONSTERS!

External links

American male screenwriters
American soap opera writers
Living people
Place of birth missing (living people)
Year of birth missing (living people)
American male television writers
Cornell University alumni